Bahia bigelovii, or Bigelow's bahia, is a North American species of flowering plants in the family Asteraceae. It is native to the State of Coahuila in Mexico and to the western (trans-Pecos) part of the US state of Texas.

Bahia bigelovii is an annual reaching a height of 30 cm (12 inches). It has yellow flower heads with both ray florets and disc florets. The species grows on sandy soils.

References

bigelovii
Flora of Coahuila
Flora of Texas
Plants described in 1859